East Orange Stadium was a football stadium located at the intersection of North Clinton St. and Park Avenue in East Orange, New Jersey. The field was used for practice and home games by the Orange Athletic Club, who later evolved into the Orange Tornadoes of the National Football League prior to the opening of Knights of Columbus Stadium in 1926. Paul Robeson Stadium, which is used by East Orange Campus High School athletics, occupies the space that was once used for the field.

References
Orange Athletic Club All-Time Football Records: Orange AC Tornadoes 1929-1933
Morris Hills High School

Orange/Newark Tornadoes
Defunct American football venues in the United States
American football venues in New Jersey
East Orange, New Jersey